My House, Your Money is a Cineflix produced realty reality programme that airs on W Network and HGTV US. My House, Your Money follows young individuals who are the hunt for their first home. However, they turn to family members for financial assistance, in which case, all family members weigh in on what home is best for the young individual.

Episodes

Episode 1 "Zochowski Family”

Episode 2 "Madigan Family”

Episode 3 "Hardman Family”

Episode 4 “The Posinelli’s”

Episode 5 "Saunders Family”

Episode 6 “Hyatt Family”

Episode 7 “Lewis Knowles”

Episode 8 “The Teeuwsen’s”

Episode 9 “The Javiers”

Episode 10 “The Arscotts”

Episode 11 “The Curbelo’s”

Episode 12 “The Lumbs”

Episode 13 "The Durands”

Episode 14 “The Avrahams”

Episode 15 "The Romms”

Episode 16 "Basinski Family”

References 

Canadian reality television series
W Network original programming
Television series by Cineflix